Lewiston is a city and the county seat of Nez Perce County, Idaho, United States, in the state's north central region. It is the second-largest city in the northern Idaho region, behind Coeur d'Alene, and ninth-largest in the state. Lewiston is the principal city of the Lewiston, ID-WA Metropolitan Statistical Area, which includes all of Nez Perce County and Asotin County, Washington. As of the 2020 census, the population of Lewiston was 34,203 up from 31,894 in 2010.

The Lewiston-Nez Perce County Airport serves the city by air.

Lewiston was founded in 1861 in the wake of a gold rush which began the previous year near Pierce, northeast of Lewiston. The city was incorporated by the Washington Territorial Legislature in January 1863. In March 1863, Lewiston became the first capital of the newly created Idaho Territory. Its stint as seat of the new territory's government was short-lived, as a resolution to have the capital moved south to Boise was passed by the Idaho Territorial Legislature on December 7, 1864.

Lewiston's main industries are agriculture, paper, and timber products, and light manufacturing. Ammunition manufacturing maintains a very important and growing presence in Lewiston, being the headquarters of ammunition makers CCI and Speer Bullet. The city is the primary regional transportation, retail, health care, and entertainment center of the surrounding area and serves as a recreation destination for the Hells Canyon National Recreation Area.

Lewiston is home to Lewis–Clark State College, a public undergraduate college. Community activities in Lewiston include the Dogwood Festival, Hot August Nights, and the Lewiston Roundup.

History 

The Nimiipuu (Nez Perce) have inhabited the area for thousands of years. 
The first people of European ancestry to visit the Lewiston area were members of the David Thompson expedition of 1803. Thompson was looking to establish fur trading posts for the Hudson's Bay Company of British North America (now Canada). Thompson established the first white settlement in Idaho, MacKenzie's Post. But it soon failed as the local Nez Perce tribe's men considered beaver trapping to be women's work, the tribe was migratory and apparently women thought they already had enough to do. This was followed by the Lewis and Clark Expedition in October 1805. At the future townsite, they encountered settlements of the native Nez Perce, and they returned to the valley on their eastward trip from the Pacific in the spring of 1806.

The town is believed to have been named after Meriwether Lewis and after Victor Trevitt's hometown of Lewiston, Maine, but people do not know that was the reason Trevitt shouted the idea out. He simply stated the "Journal of Lewis and Clark" talked about being in the valley. The town was founded  in 1861, in the wake of a gold rush which began the previous year near Pierce, northeast of Lewiston leading to the Nez Perce War and the removal of Nez Perce. The first newspaper in present-day Idaho, The Golden Age, began publication in the city of Lewiston, Washington Territory in 1862, and was joined by the present (and only) newspaper, the Lewiston Morning Tribune in September 1892. In March 1863 Lewiston became the capital of the newly created Idaho Territory. Thomas J. Beall, one of the first three white settlers in Lewiston, wrote many of the Lewiston Tribunes first articles, and continued to do so until his death at the age of 89.

The city's stint as a seat of the new territory's government was short-lived. As the gold rush quieted in northern Idaho, it heated up in a new mineral rush in southwestern Idaho, centered in Idaho City, which became the largest city in the Northwest in the mid-1860s. A resolution in late 1864 to have the capital moved from Lewiston to Boise was passed by the Idaho Territorial Legislature on December 7, six weeks before the territorial legislature's session legally began, and after litigation, on a split decision decided by one vote on the territorial supreme court on geographic lines.

Boise became the capital in 1866; the move was very unpopular in northern Idaho and in violation of a court order. So, the territorial governor, Caleb Lyon and the territorial secretary, secretly took the territorial seal, archives, and treasury, and fled from Lewiston. Lyon went down river to Portland, Oregon, a trip marked by the alleged theft of the treasury from his steamship cabin. The territorial secretary departed southward for Boise to avoid the public outrage that was sure to erupt.

Lewiston State Normal School, now Lewis-Clark State College, was established in 1893, as was another normal school or teacher education college, now defunct, in the south at Albion. These were the state's first three institutions of higher education. Lewiston was the site of the first public school in Idaho, in 1862. In December 1880, the district was the first to be chartered by the Legislature and thus carries the designation of Lewiston Independent School District #1. (Boise was second, opening school doors in 1865.)

The City of Lewiston’s high reservoir failed on January 18, 2023. The failure caused flooding with the release of approximately three million gallons of water.

Geography

Lewiston is located at the confluence of the Snake and Clearwater rivers. Immediately west of Lewiston is the smaller twin city of Clarkston, Washington. The north-flowing Snake River departs Hells Canyon and forms the state boundary with Washington, while west-flowing Clearwater River defines the northern border of the city. At their confluence at the city's northwest corner, the lower Snake River turns west into Washington, and after passing four dams, empties into the Columbia River at Burbank.

Lower Granite Dam 

 northwest of the city is the Lower Granite Dam, the last and upper-most of the four dams on the lower Snake River, the largest tributary of the Columbia River. It was completed  in 1975, and raised the river level back to Lewiston, effectively making it the eastern end of the new reservoir, Lower Granite Lake. Because of these dams (and their locks), Lewiston is navigable by some ocean-going vessels. Barges of timber products, grain, and other goods are shipped via the Snake-Columbia system to the Pacific. The first barge went to Portland; it was loaded with wheat and departed Lewiston on August 9, 1975.

Levees 
Lewiston's main industries are agriculture, the paper and timber products from the mill owned and operated by the Clearwater Paper Corporation (until December 2008, a part of the Potlatch Corporation), and light manufacturing.

Along much of the Snake River is a system of levees to protect against flooding; most are maintained by the U.S. Army Corps of Engineers.

The lowest point in the state of Idaho is located on the Snake River in Lewiston, where it meets the Clearwater and flows west into Washington.

The Orchards 

The heavily residential southern half of the city is referred to as "The Orchards". Formerly unincorporated, it was annexed  which nearly doubled the city's population and doubled the area of the city. There is little sign of any orchards today, although there is a wide proliferation of fruit trees in the backyards of many residences in this area of town.

Climate
Lewiston experiences a semi-arid climate (Köppen BSk) with occasionally cold, but short, winters, mostly influenced by mild Pacific air, and hot, dry summers.

At 195 days, the growing season is relatively long, with the average window for freezing temperatures being October 23 thru April 10. The plant hardiness zone are 7 and 8 with temperatures below  being rare. Tornadoes are very rare with only three tornadoes being reported in Nez Perce County since 1950, and the only significant tornado was an F2 in Lapwai on May 8, 1962.

Demographics

2010 census
 
As of the census of 2010, there were 31,894 people, 13,324 households, and 8,201 families residing in the city. The racial makeup of the city was 93.9% White, 0.3% African American, 1.7% Native American, 0.8% Asian, 0.1% Pacific Islander, 0.7% from other races, and 2.4% from two or more races. Hispanic or Latino of any race were 2.8% of the population.

There were 13,324 households, of which 27.8% had children under the age of 18 living with them, 47.0% were married couples living together, 10.3% had a female householder with no husband present, 4.3% had a male householder with no wife present, and 38.4% were non-families. 30.2% of all households were made up of individuals, and 12.8% had someone living alone who was 65 years of age or older. The average household size was 2.32 and the average family size was 2.87.

The median age in the city was 39.9 years. 21.5% of residents were under the age of 18; 10.8% were between the ages of 18 and 24; 23.8% were from 25 to 44; 25.6% were from 45 to 64; and 18.2% were 65 years of age or older. The gender makeup of the city was 49.2% male and 50.8% female.

2000 census
As of the census of 2000, there were 30,905 people, 12,795 households, and 8,278 families residing in the city. The racial makeup of the city was 95.14% White, 0.30% African American, 1.59% Native American, 0.76% Asian, 0.08% Pacific Islander, 0.51% from other races, and 1.61% from two or more races. Hispanic or Latino of any race were 1.91% of the population.

There were 12,795 households, out of which 28.7% included children under the age of 18, 51.3% were married couples living together, 9.3% had a female householder with no husband present, and 35.3% were non-families. 27.9% of all households were made up of individuals, and 12.0% were a single person living alone who was 65 years of age or older. The average household size was 2.36 and the average family size was 2.88.

In the city, the population was spread out, with 23.3% under the age of 18, 10.7% from 18 to 24, 26.7% from 25 to 44, 22.3% from 45 to 64, and 17.0% who were 65 years of age or older. The median age was 38 years. For every 100 females, there were 95.3 males. For every 100 females age 18 and over, there were 92.1 males.

The median income for a household in the city was $36,606, and the median income for a family was $45,410. Males had a median income of $35,121 versus $22,805 for females. The per capita income for the city was $19,091. About 8.4% of families and 12.0% of the population were below the poverty line, including 15.2% of those under age 18 and 6.5% of those aged 65 or over.

Historical demographics
 1864 census: 359 (247 men, 58 women, 54 children)
 1863 census: 414 (306 men, 59 women, 49 children)

Economy 

Lewiston's economy has historically been driven by agriculture and manufacturing activity. Lewiston's location at the confluence of the Snake River and Clearwater River made it a natural distribution point due to its seaport.

The Port of Lewiston is Idaho's only seaport and is navigable for barges which transport grain, fuel, legumes, paper, lumber and other goods up and down the Columbia River.

Paper product manufacturer, Clearwater Paper is the largest employer in the manufacturing sector; its pulp and paper mill began operations in late 1950. Ammunition manufacturing maintains an important and growing presence in Lewiston. Ammunition maker CCI, and Speer Bullet (both now brands of Vista Outdoor) are headquartered in Lewiston and Howell Munitions & Technology has a plant in the city as well. Schweitzer Engineering Laboratories, based in Pullman, has a manufacturing facility in Lewiston.

As the metropolitan hub of the Lewis-Clark Valley, Lewiston is the primary regional transportation, retail, health care, wholesale and professional services, and entertainment center. In 2017, the Lewiston, ID–Clarkston, WA metropolitan area had a gross metropolitan product of $2.5 billion. With the presence of Lewis–Clark State College, it is also a center for education and workforce training.

Lewiston's economy is slowly diversifying, which has helped keep the economy stable. Lewiston serves as a recreation destination for the Hells Canyon National Recreation Area.

Arts and culture

In springtime Lewiston hosts the Dogwood Festival. This celebration is named for the abundant dogwood trees that are in fragrant bloom during the festival. During and shortly after the festival these pink blossoms blow through yards and streets like drifts of snow. The festival also hosts the "Show and Shine" classic car show alongside the other attractions.

During late summer, "Hot August Nights" takes place. This celebration includes concerts by popular 1950s to 1980s musicians, such as .38 Special, Eddie Money, and Loverboy. There's also a show and shine for collectible cars, followed by a night parade along Main Street. During the fall, a number of cottonwood trees release cotton-like clouds of seeds that blow through the air and streets, blanketing them with a snow-like cover.

The town has a large Christmas festival that includes a number of lighted displays in the downtown area. At the site of what was originally the Johann D. C. Thiessen mansion and ranch, now Locomotive Park, so named because of the retired locomotive Steam Engine 92 and Camas Prairie RR Caboose on display in the middle, large trees and pathways are decorated with lights from Thanksgiving to New Year's. These events are sponsored by the Chamber of Commerce, and the displays involved are typically quite impressive and often attract many visitors.

During the Christmas and Easter seasons, the Lewiston Jaycees have two large lighted displays on the Lewiston Hill (technically, the Washington side, and specifically, in Whitman County, above Clarkston in Washington state), visible from nearly everywhere in the valley. The display consists of long strings of ordinary light bulbs, arranged in the shape of a star (Christmas) and a cross (Easter). The same strings of lights are used in both displays, which, when lit, are left burning 24 hours a day through each season.

Every year, with cooperation from the city, Lewis-Clark State College hosts the Avista NAIA World Series for college baseball in May, and the Lewiston Round Up rodeo in September. The Lewiston Round Up is a member of the Big 4 or Big Money 4 (along with Pendleton Round-Up, Walla Walla Fair and Rodeo, and Ellensburg Rodeo) and a top 50 PRCA rodeo.

Lewiston had a popular Northwest League professional baseball franchise from 1952 through 1974. The Lewis-Clark Broncs were affiliated with various major league parent clubs, including the Philadelphia Phillies, Kansas City Athletics, St. Louis Cardinals, Baltimore Orioles, and Oakland Athletics (or A's). A roster check in 1967 showed that 40% of the players and coaches of the Kansas City Athletics had been in Lewiston at one time or another. Reggie Jackson was perhaps the most famous Lewiston Bronc of all-time; Mr. October played twelve games for Lewiston at age 20 in 1966. The Broncs' rosters included Rick Monday, manager John McNamara, Vearl ("Snag") Moore, Thorton ("Kip") Kipper, Antonio Perez, Ron Koepper, Delmer Owen, Dick Green, Bud Swan, Bert Campaneris, John Israel, Dave Duncan, Al Heist, and as a player, later coach-manager Robert ("Gabby") Williams. After years of financial losses, the team was shut down in Lewiston in January 1975, and resurfaced in June in southwestern Idaho as the Boise A's for

Education

Lewiston is home to Lewis-Clark State College and the Lewiston Independent School District; the latter operates public secondary schools, which are Lewiston High School, Jenifer Junior High, and Sacajawea Junior High. The seven elementary schools are Whitman, Webster, Centennial, Orchards, Camelot, McGhee, and McSorley.

The Northwest Children´s Home has a treatment facility in Lewiston.

In athletics, Lewiston High competes in IHSAA Class 5A, for the largest enrollments in the state, in the Inland Empire League (5A). The mascot is the Golden Bengal with school colors of purple and gold. Lewiston has the oldest school system in Idaho, started  in 1863. The Lewiston School District is Independent School District #1.

Lewis-Clark State College is also the athletic home to the Warriors of the National Association of Intercollegiate Athletics (NAIA); LCSC's Harris Field ballpark hosts the NAIA World Series, of which the Warriors have won 19 national titles in baseball; the first sixteen were under head coach Ed Cheff.

Media
Lewiston's newspaper is the Lewiston Morning Tribune, founded  in 1892. The local television station is KLEW-TV, a CBS affiliate which signed-on December 7, 1955.

Infrastructure

Highways

 – U.S. 12
 – U.S. 95
 – SH 128
On the city's north end, the old 10-mile US highway 95 that climbs  of the Lewiston Hill (elev. ) grade to the Palouse is mostly out of use, except for the truly adventurous traveler and couple of businesses and several residences built for the panoramic views. Called the "Old Spiral Highway," the very twisty road (64 curves) was opened in 1917 and was the primary route north for sixty years. It received an award as one of the best-engineered stretches of mountain highway at the time.

The 1950s rock-and-roll hit "Hot Rod Lincoln," later covered in the 1970s by Commander Cody and His Lost Planet Airmen, tells of an actual race on that hill. The lyrics of the song were changed variously to say San Pedro or The Grapevine in later versions, but the origin is documented.

At the top, it joins with U.S. 95−U.S. 195. Both grades provide excellent views of the Lewiston-Clarkston area and beyond.

Airport

Nonstop scheduled passenger airline service to Denver (DEN) via United Express and Salt Lake City (SLC) via Delta Connection is operated from the Lewiston - Nez Perce County Airport (LWS) with both air carriers operating regional jet aircraft on behalf of their respective major airline partners, United Airlines and Delta Air Lines.

Notable people
Austin Arnett, MMA fighter
Bryan Fuller, screenwriter, television producer
Julie Gibson, actress
Michael P. Mitchell, member of the Idaho Legislature
Jack O'Connor, author, hunting and shooting sports editor of Outdoor Life
Jason Schmidt, Major League Baseball pitcher
Jake Scott, guard with Philadelphia Eagles
Grace Vollmer, painter

References

Notes

Citations

Further reading
Mueller, Gene (1980) Lewiston: From packtrains and tent saloons to highways and brick stores : a century of progress, 1861-1962 OCLC 890507211
Mueller, Gene (1986) Lewiston: A pictorial history Lewiston Chamber of Commerce OCLC 15344376

External links

 
 Lewiston Chamber of Commerce

 
Cities in Idaho
Cities in Nez Perce County, Idaho
Former colonial and territorial capitals in the United States
County seats in Idaho
Populated places established in 1861
Lewiston–Clarkston metropolitan area
Inland port cities and towns of the United States
1861 establishments in Washington Territory